Georgy Nikolayevich Zarubin (6 May 1900 – 24 November 1958) was a Soviet diplomat. He was Soviet Ambassador to Canada (1944–46), United Kingdom (1946–52) and United States (1952–58). Before that he headed the Industrial Academy in 1931–1935.

References

1900 births
1958 deaths
People from Kolyshleysky District
People from Serdobsky Uyezd
Ambassadors of the Soviet Union to Canada
Ambassadors of the Soviet Union to the United Kingdom
Ambassadors of the Soviet Union to the United States
Central Committee of the Communist Party of the Soviet Union candidate members
Moscow State Textile University alumni
Recipients of the Order of the Red Banner of Labour
Cold War diplomats
Burials at Novodevichy Cemetery